Arjen (also spelled as Arjan) is a given name, a variant of the Dutch/Finnish name Adrian. Arjen (sometimes also Ariën) is derived from the Latin name Adrianus.

The name Adrianus means "native of, from Adria", a place near Venice. Adria is associated with Latin ater, meaning "dull black" or "dark", a reference to the dark sands along the coast of the Adriatic Sea. Hadrian is the name of a famous Roman emperor (his family was from Hadria in the Picenum countryside). Adrian VI (1522-1523) was the first Dutch pope. The name Arjen is mainly found in the Netherlands.

Notable people with the name include:
Arjen Anthony Lucassen (born 1960), Dutch composer and musician
Arjen Douwes Dekker (born 1996), Dutch-Spanish historian
Arjen Eggebeen (born 1996), Dutch music producer known by the name Ahrix
Arjen Lenstra (born 1956), Dutch mathematician
Arjen Lubach (born 1979), Dutch comedian
Arjen Robben (born 1984), Dutch former professional footballer
Arjen Roelofs (1754–1828), Dutch astronomer
Arjen Teeuwissen (born 1971), Dutch equestrian
Arjen Tuiten (born 1980), Dutch makeup effects artist who worked on Pan's Labyrinth and inherited Rick Baker's company
Arjen Lantis (born 1986), Italian Nail Artist and International Master Instructor freelance. Owner of Arjen Lantis Nails, Studio in the centre of Parma.

Dutch masculine given names